1812 election may refer to:
Louisiana gubernatorial election, 1812
1812 United Kingdom general election
1812 United States presidential election
United States House of Representatives elections, 1812 and 1813